= L'appel (Belgian magazine) =

Belgian magazine

- Editor: L'appel asbl
- Frequency: monthly
- Founded: 1976; 50 years ago
- Country: Belgium
- Based in: Namur
- Language: French
- Website: L'appel

L'appel is a Belgian monthly magazine. First published in 1976, this magazine was born in Liège as the heir to the Liège parish newspaper L’appel des cloches. It is mainly distributed in Wallonia and Brussels, but also in Flanders and several foreign countries (France, Switzerland, Luxembourg). 5000 copies are printed.

The magazine's charter specifies that L'appel bases its values on the common good. It defends democracy, a society where everyone is free, including the freedom to associate, citizen involvement and participation, solidarity, and collective projects that inspire." It adds that the magazine "exists so that its readers can form critical opinions, think for themselves, and take action. Current events are addressed and analyzed for the questions they raise. L'appel magazine presents arguments, diversifies its sources, and stimulates debate.".

In 2016, its editor-in-chief, Frédéric Antoine, explained that "spiritual reflection is a concern for our contemporaries. We wanted to be part of this evolution. The question of meaning will now be the filter through which we look at the world.". The question of meaning was the subject of a survey in 2019 which showed that French-speaking Belgians attach great importance to it.
